Chicken skewers may refer to:
 Dak-kkochi, Korean chicken skewers
 Jūjeh kabāb, Iranian chicken skewers
 Shish taouk, Middle Eastern chicken skewers
 Yakitori, Japanese chicken skewers